Benjamin Paa Kwesi Henrichs (born 23 February 1997) is a German professional footballer who plays as a full-back or midfielder for Bundesliga club RB Leipzig and the  Germany national team.

Club career

Bayer Leverkusen
Henrichs is an academy graduate of Bayer Leverkusen, whom he joined at the age of seven, and captained the side at under-19 level. Having impressed during his formative years with the club, he was promoted to the senior side in 2015 and made his Bundesliga debut on 20 September when he came on as a second-half substitute for Karim Bellarabi in a 3–0 defeat to Borussia Dortmund. He became a regular with the side the following season during which he amassed 29 appearances for the campaign. He ultimately went on to make over 80 appearances for the club across all competitions before signing for Ligue 1 side AS Monaco in August 2018.

AS Monaco
On 28 August 2018, Henrichs joined Monaco on a five-year contract.

RB Leipzig (loan)
On 8 July 2020, Henrichs joined RB Leipzig on a season-long loan. The deal included an option to buy for €15 million at the end of the season.

RB Leipzig
On 12 April 2021, Henrichs joined RB Leipzig on a permanent deal. RB Leipzig activated the €15 million buyout option.

International career
Henrichs was born in Germany to a German father and a Ghanaian mother and was eligible to represent both nations prior to making his debut for Germany. In a 2017 interview, he revealed that Ghanaian midfielder Michael Essien was his idol growing up but he chose to represent Germany because they were the nation which approached him when he was still a teenager.

Germany

On 4 November 2016, Henrichs was called up to the German national side for the first time by manager Joachim Löw for the nation's World Cup qualifier against San Marino and a friendly match against Italy. Seven days later, he made his debut against the former in an 8–0 victory for Germany.

The following year, he was named in Löw's squad for the 2017 FIFA Confederations Cup – the curtain raiser for the 2018 FIFA World Cup – and made two appearances as Germany went on to lift the title. He was later excluded from Germany's World Cup squad.

Career statistics

Club

International

Honours
RB Leipzig
 DFB-Pokal: 2021–22

Germany
FIFA Confederations Cup: 2017

Individual
 Fritz Walter Medal U19 Gold: 2016

References

External links

Profile at the RB Leipzig website

1997 births
Living people
People from Bocholt, Germany
Sportspeople from Münster (region)
Footballers from North Rhine-Westphalia
Germany youth international footballers
Germany under-21 international footballers
Olympic footballers of Germany
Germany international footballers
German footballers
Association football defenders
Association football midfielders
Bayer 04 Leverkusen players
AS Monaco FC players
RB Leipzig players
Bundesliga players
Ligue 1 players
2017 FIFA Confederations Cup players
Footballers at the 2020 Summer Olympics
FIFA Confederations Cup-winning players
German expatriate footballers
Expatriate footballers in Monaco
German expatriate sportspeople in Monaco
German sportspeople of Ghanaian descent